The 1932–33 İstanbul Football League season was the 25th season of the league. Fenerbahçe SK won the league for the 6th time.

Season

References

Istanbul Football League seasons
Turkey
Istanbul